Genoveva Eichenmann (born September 12, 1957) is a retired female long-distance runner from Switzerland. She set her personal best (2:34:43) in the marathon on April 24, 1988 in Zürich.

Achievements

References
 
 ARRS 1988 Year Ranking

1957 births
Living people
Swiss female marathon runners
Olympic athletes of Switzerland
Athletes (track and field) at the 1988 Summer Olympics